Società Sportiva Scafatese Calcio 1922 is an Italian association football club located in Scafati, Campania. Currently it plays in Eccellenza Campania.

History

Foundation 
The club was founded in 1922 as Unione Sportiva Scafatese.

Serie B 
In the season 1946–47 and in the next it played in Serie B South.

From Terza Categoria to Eccellenza 
In the summer 2010 for financial problems, it does not join 2010–11 Lega Pro Seconda Divisione and restarted from Terza Categoria. The team was promoted to Promozione Campania in the 2012–13 season after an ascent started in Terza Categoria Salerno/A in the 2010–11 season.
In the summer 2013 it merged with Montecorvino Rovella, club of Eccellenza.
In the 2013–14 season it played with the fellow-citizen of A.S.D. U.S. Scafatese Calcio.

Colors and badge 
Its colors are blue and yellow.

External links 
 Official homepage

Football clubs in Campania
Association football clubs established in 1922
Serie B clubs
Serie C clubs
Serie D clubs
1922 establishments in Italy